Greensburg is a home rule-class city in and the county seat of Green County, Kentucky, United States. The population was 2,163 at the 2010 census, down from 2,396 at the 2000 census.

The Downtown Greensburg Historic District is on the National Register of Historic Places and includes the oldest courthouse west of the Allegheny Mountains.

Geography
Greensburg is located east of the center of Green County at  (37.259665, -85.497863), on the north side of the Green River, a west-flowing tributary of the Ohio River. U.S. Route 68 passes through the city as Main Street; it leads northeast  to Campbellsville and southwest  to Edmonton. Kentucky Route 61 joins US 68 on Main Street through Greensburg; KY 61 leads northwest  to Elizabethtown and southeast  to Columbia.

Climate
The climate in this area is characterized by hot, humid summers and generally mild to cool winters.  According to the Köppen Climate Classification system, Greensburg has a humid subtropical climate, abbreviated "Cfa" on climate maps.

History
The 1780 settlement was originally known as "Glover's Station", for local landowner John Glover, who received  in the area as a military grant after the American Revolution.

Following the establishment of Green County (named for Revolutionary War Maj. General Nathanael Greene) from parts of Lincoln and Nelson counties in 1792, Greensburg was laid out and established two years later as its eponymous seat of government. It was incorporated as a city a year after that. The central Public Square was also laid out in 1795 and has been retained as designed since then, with the only changes being the paving of the square with concrete and the installation of concrete dividers and parking meters in the four quadrants.

The first post office arrived in 1807 and was variously known as "Greensburg" and "Greensburg Court House" during the early 19th century.

The first courthouse in Greensburg was established in 1803 

The first bank, Greensburg Independent Bank, was establish in 1818 

The first known school in Greensburg, called Greenburg Academy, was open from 1815-18

Demographics

As of the census of 2000, there were 2,396 people, 1,061 households, and 648 families residing in the city. The racial makeup of the city was 92.99% White, 4.63% African American, 0.08% Native American, 0.38% Asian, 0.50% from other races, and 1.42% from two or more races. Hispanic or Latino of any race were 0.96% of the population.

There were 1,061 households, out of which 24.8% had children under the age of 18 living with them, 43.6% were married couples living together, 14.1% had a female householder with no husband present, and 38.9% were non-families. 37.1% of all households were made up of individuals, and 21.3% had someone living alone who was 65 years of age or older. The average household size was 2.12 and the average family size was 2.75.

In the city, the population was spread out, with 21.5% under the age of 18, 7.7% from 18 to 24, 22.1% from 25 to 44, 23.4% from 45 to 64, and 25.3% who were 65 years of age or older. The median age was 44 years. For every 100 females, there were 78.5 males. For every 100 females age 18 and over, there were 71.5 males.

The median income for a household in the city was $20,556, and the median income for a family was $29,818. Males had a median income of $26,065 versus $18,031 for females. The per capita income for the city was $14,296. About 21.3% of families and 24.8% of the population were below the poverty line, including 34.8% of those under age 18 and 13.5% of those age 65 or over.

Education
Greensburg has a lending library, the Green County Public Library.

The public school system, Green County Public Schools, consists of 4 different schools. As of 2021, the school system consists of 1,648 students.

Events 
Greensburg holds an annual festival called Cow Days

Notable people
 John Richard Barret, U.S. congressman from Missouri
 Aylette Buckner, U.S. congressman from Kentucky
 George Washington Buckner, physician and diplomat; United States minister to Liberia from 1913 to 1915
 Richard Aylett Buckner, U.S. congressman from Kentucky and father of Aylette Buckner
 Mentor Graham, teacher best known for tutoring Abraham Lincoln
 Aaron Harding, U.S. congressman from Kentucky
 Rod Henderson, former Major League Baseball pitcher
 William Herndon, friend and biographer of Abraham Lincoln
 Edward H. Hobson, Union Army general during the Civil War
 Blake Judd, independent filmmaker
 John W. Lewis, U.S. congressman from Kentucky
 Dakota Meyer, U.S. Marine and Medal of Honor recipient
 William Thomas Ward, Union general during the Civil War and U.S. congressman

References

External links
 City of Greensburg official website

Cities in Green County, Kentucky
County seats in Kentucky
Cities in Kentucky
1794 establishments in Kentucky